The Microcorsini are a tribe of tortrix moths in the subfamily Olethreutinae, first described by V I Kuznetsov in 1970.

Genera
Cryptaspasma

References